David Lale (born 1962) is a cellist from England, who now lives in Australia. He is Principal Cellist of  The Queensland Orchestra. He studied at the Royal Academy of Music in the UK, with Douglas Cummings, and was made an Honorary Associate in 1997. He has worked with the BBC Symphony Orchestra, London Symphony Orchestra, Royal Philharmonic Orchestra and London Virtuosi chamber orchestra. Before moving to Brisbane, he held the position of Assistant Principal Cello with the BBC Philharmonic Orchestra.

David is the uncle of the British cellist David Lale.

 Recordings 

Eccles "Cello Sonata in G minor"

1962 births
Living people
Australian classical cellists
Alumni of the Royal Academy of Music